The 1933–34 Scottish Cup was the 56th staging of Scotland's most prestigious football knockout competition. The Cup was won by Rangers who defeated St Mirren in the final.

Fourth round

Semi-finals

Final

Teams

See also
1933–34 in Scottish football

References

External links
Scottish Cup Final, video footage from official Pathé News archive

Scottish Cup seasons
Cup
Scot